The Wrocław Open (formerly known as KGHM Dialog Polish Indoors) was a professional tennis tournament played on indoor hard courts. It was part of the Association of Tennis Professionals (ATP) Challenger Tour. It was held at the Hala Orbita in Wrocław, Poland.
The record holder with two doubles titles is Lukáš Rosol.

Past finals

Singles

Doubles

External links
Official website
ITF Search

 
ATP Challenger Tour
Tretorn SERIE+ tournaments
Hard court tennis tournaments
Indoor tennis tournaments
Tennis tournaments in Poland
Sport in Wrocław